Roupala pinnata is a species of plant in the family Proteaceae. It is endemic to Peru.

References

Trees of Peru
pinnata
Vulnerable plants
Taxonomy articles created by Polbot
Taxobox binomials not recognized by IUCN